Athetis tarda, the slowpoke moth, is a moth of the  family Noctuidae. It is found in North America, where it has been recorded from New Hampshire to Florida and from Missouri to Texas. The habitat consists of oak woodlands.

The wingspan is 23–35 mm. The forewings are dark greyish-brown with darker but inconspicuous lines and blackish inconspicuous spots. There is usually a group of four pale dots around the reniform spot. Adults are on wing from late March to May and again from late August to September.

The larvae feed on dead Quercus leaves.

References

Caradrinini
Moths described in 1852
Moths of North America